Ballarat Clarendon College is an independent, co-educational, day and boarding school, located in Ballarat, Victoria, Australia.

Formerly affiliated with the Presbyterian Church of Australia, it now operates in association with the Uniting Church in Australia (but is not governed or managed by the Church) and is a member of the Ballarat Associated Schools.

Academic standing 
Clarendon was ranked number third in all of Victoria in 2020.

Co-curriculum

Sport 
The College participates in many sports both within and outside the Ballarat Associated Schools.

The Boys First XI Cricket team won the premiership in the 2008/2009 season, over rivals St Patricks's College. The firsts then, after winning this premiership, made the final in "The Lord Taverner's Cup" but were defeated in Shepparton by Notre Dame College.

Another notable sport participated within the school is rowing. The rowing program starts at Year 8 and continues through the years. In 2008 and 2010 the BCC Girls' First Crew won the annual their respective Head of the River race at the Barwon River in Geelong and consequently won the Head of the Schoolgirls' competition.

College has built a foundation in volleyball, providing many representatives in both Boys and Girls respective competitions. The College boys have won the past four premierships inside the BAS realms.

BAS premierships 
BCC has won the following BAS premierships.

Combined:

 Athletics (12) – 1980, 1981, 1982, 1983, 1984, 1985, 1988, 1989, 1992, 1993, 1994, 1996
 Badminton (3) – 1982, 1990, 1991
 Cross Country (3) – 1980, 1981, 2011
 Lap of the Lake (2) – 1980, 1981

Boys:

 Athletics (2) – 1983, 1989
 Basketball (7) – 1982, 1984, 1985, 1993, 1996, 2008, 2009
 Cricket (5) – 1980, 1988, 2005, 2009, 2016
 Cricket T20 – 2015
 Cross Country – 1985
 Football (4) – 1980, 2002, 2005, 2006
 Hockey (8) – 1985, 1995, 1997, 1998, 2006, 2016, 2017, 2018
 Rowing premiership, Harold Deveson Cup (8) - 1975, 1976, 1988, 1990, 1991, 1998, 2021, 2022
 Soccer (7) – 1979, 1980, 1999, 2006, 2007, 2011, 2015
 Tennis (5) – 1977, 2006, 2007, 2011, 2013
 Volleyball (5) – 2007, 2008, 2009, 2010, 2020

Girls:

 Athletics (12) – 1980, 1981, 1982, 1983, 1985, 1986, 1988, 1989, 1992, 1993, 1994, 1996
 Badminton (2) – 2011, 2012
 Basketball (6) – 1990, 2001, 2011, 2013, 2016, 2017
 Cricket (4) – 1985, 1998, 2020, 2021
 Cross Country (6) – 1980, 1981, 1993, 2004, 2005, 2011
 Football (14) – 1996, 1997, 1998, 2002, 2003, 2004, 2005, 2006, 2007, 2009, 2010, 2011, 2012, 2013
 Head of the Lake, Patterson Shield (14) - 1981, 1983, 1984, 1989, 2002, 2005, 2008, 2010, 2011, 2014, 2015, 2021, 2022
 Hockey (21) – 1974, 1975, 1979, 1980, 1982, 1983, 1984, 1985, 1986, 1987, 1989, 1991, 1996, 1998, 2010, 2012, 2013, 2014, 2015, 2016, 2018
 Lap of the Lake (7) – 1980, 1981, 2005, 2006, 2007, 2008, 2011
 Netball (13) – 1984, 1986, 1987, 1988, 1989, 1993, 2003, 2004, 2007, 2011, 2012, 2017, 2019
 Road Relay (3) – 1999, 2005, 2008
 Rowing Premiership, J H Netherway Cup (11) - 1981, 1984, 1989, 1990, 2008, 2009, 2010, 2011*, 2013, 2014, 2021
 Soccer (2) – 2012, 2019
 Softball (10) – 1985, 1986, 1987, 1990, 1998, 2002, 2003, 2004, 2005, 2006
 Volleyball (7) – 1978, 1980, 1983, 1984, 1985, 2001, 2011

Performing arts
The school has a free standing building on the east of the senior campus where all aspects of Performing Arts take place, subsequently called, the Performing Arts Centre (PAC). From years 5–8 students partake in different Arts Classes which rotate each trimester, Music, Art and Drama or Dance (alternating each year). In year 9 students are able to choose which performing and visual arts they do for each term and Year 10 and VCE students may choose out of the various higher level VCE arts classes the school offers. Students accordingly participate in music lessons for:

Brass – Trumpet, French Horn, Trombone, Euphonium and Tuba
Woodwind – Flute, Clarinet (+Bass Clarinet), all Saxomaphone types, Oboe, Recorder and Bassoon
Piano – Piano, Contemporary Piano
Keyboard
Guitar – Classical Guitar, Electric Guitar, Bass Guitar
Strings – Violin, Viola, Violoncello and Double Bass
Music Theory
Speech Art
Voice (Classical And Contemporary)

They may participate in any of the student ensembles at the school. They are :
Novice Band
The Geoff Smith Jazz Orchestra
Concert Band
The Barry Currie Stage Band
Chamber Ensemble
Orchestra
Intermediate and Senior Strings
and numerous contemporary bands.

Ballarat Clarendon College also has a contemporary funk/dance band called Feet, who give regular gigs around the school, Ballarat and Victoria.

In addition, the College puts on an annual Senior School Production, Senior School Play and Middle School Production. They also have an annual Performing Arts Showcase performance for both the Junior and Senior School and a Middle School and Senior School Presentation Night.

Notable alumni

Art
David Davies, Artist
Gwyn Hanssen Pigott, Ceramic artist

Defence
Major General Harold "Pompey" Edward Elliott, Distinguished Soldier and Senator
Major John Garbutt
Admiral Sir Guy Gaunt, Chief of British Intelligence in the US, WWII

Diplomatic service
William Paterson, PSM, former Australian Ambassador (Thailand) and Australian Ambassador Counter Terrorism
Sir Patrick Shaw, Australian Ambassador to Washington 1974–75

Fashion
Joe Saba, Fashion designer

Law
Rt Hon Lord Augustus Andrewes Uthwatt, House of Lords
Robina Fordyce Cowper, Magistrate Children's Court, Melbourne

Performing arts/media
Kimberley Davies, Actress
Bill Hunter, Actor
Elsie Morison, Soprano
Benjamin Northey, Conductor

Politics
John Button, Senator
Bernard Dowiyogo, President, Nauru
Michael Ronaldson, Senator

AFL
Flynn Appleby, Collingwood
Kurt Aylett, GWS Giants, Essendon
Percy Beames, Melbourne Football Club, 1930–41 premiership teams; captain-coach 1942–44
Jarrod Berry, Brisbane Lions
Tom Berry (Australian footballer), Brisbane Lions
John Birt, Essendon Football Club, member of 1962 and 1965 premiership teams; W.S. Crichton Medalist in 1961, 1965 and 1967
Luke Brennan, Hawthorn, Sydney Swans
Alastair Clarkson, 2008 Premiership coach of the Hawthorn Football Club
Bob "Geelong Flier" Davis, Geelong Football Club, Member of 1951–52 premiership teams, Captain 1955–58, Best and Fairest 1957
Matt Dea, Richmond & Essendon
Willem Drew, Port Adelaide
Ken Fyffe, North Melbourne
Jeremy Humm – AFL Footballer (West Coast & Richmond)
Michael Jamison, Carlton Football Club
Hugh McCluggage, Brisbane Lions
Sebastian Ross, St Kilda
David Shaw
Darcy Tucker, Fremantle Football Club
Ben Hobbs
Other sport
Percy Beames, Cricket,  represented Victoria  1933–46; team captain 1946
Graham Crouch, Athletics, Olympian Montreal 1976
Lucas Hamilton, Cycling, Olympian, 2021 Tour de France rider
Sarah Heard, Rowing, Olympian and World Champion
Shirley McIver, Olympian
Stewart McSweyn, Athletics, Olympian
Stefan Nigro, Football, A-League player
Sharon Stewart, Athletics, Olympian
Andrew Symonds, Cricket, Australian national representative
Kat Werry, Rowing, Olympian and World Champion

See also 
 List of schools in Ballarat
 List of schools in Victoria
 List of high schools in Victoria
 List of boarding schools
 Victorian Certificate of Education

References

External links 
 Ballarat Clarendon College website

Private secondary schools in Victoria (Australia)
Educational institutions established in 1864
Boarding schools in Victoria (Australia)
Uniting Church schools in Australia
Ballarat Associated Schools
Schools in Ballarat
1864 establishments in Australia